Butte is a small town in, and the county seat of, Boyd County, Nebraska, United States.  Its population was 326 according to the 2010 census, down from 366 in 2000.

History
Butte was named from the small hills, or buttes, near the town site.

The Central Interstate Low Level Radioactive Waste Compact and US Ecology purchased land two miles west of Butte in the early 1990s. The land was to become the site of the compact's dump; however, following extensive controversy, the dump was eventually removed from consideration. Nebraska was officially removed from the compact after a series of long court battles that ended in 2004. The state of Nebraska had to pay a settlement and there have been attempts made to sell the compact's land just outside Butte.

Geography
Butte is located at  (42.911549, -98.846830).

Climate
This climatic region is typified by large seasonal temperature differences, with warm to hot (and often humid) summers and cold (sometimes severely cold) winters.   According to the Köppen Climate Classification system, Butte has a humid continental climate, abbreviated "Dfa" on climate maps.

Demographics

2010 census
As of the census of 2010, there were 326 people, 144 households, and 83 families residing in the village. The racial makeup of the village was 96.0% White, 1.2% Native American, 2.5% Asian, and 0.3% from two or more races. Hispanic or Latino of any race were 0.9% of the population.

There were 144 households, of which 18.8% had children under the age of 18 living with them, 52.1% were married couples living together, 3.5% had a female householder with no husband present, 2.1% had a male householder with no wife present, and 42.4% were non-families. 39.6% of all households were made up of individuals, and 20.2% had someone living alone who was 65 years of age or older. The average household size was 2.08 and the average family size was 2.73.

The median age in the village was 51.8 years. 16.9% of residents were under the age of 18; 7% were between the ages of 18 and 24; 16.6% were from 25 to 44; 30.1% were from 45 to 64; and 29.4% were 65 years of age or older. The gender makeup of the village was 47.2% male and 52.8% female.

2000 census
As of the census of 2000, there were 366 people, 152 households, and 81 families residing in the village. The population density was 867.6 people per square mile (336.5/km). There were 199 housing units at an average density of 471.7 per square mile (182.9/km). The racial makeup of the village was 98.91% White, 0.82% Native American, and 0.27% from two or more races.

There were 152 households, out of which 23.7% had children under the age of 18 living with them, 50.7% were married couples living together, 2.0% had a female householder with no husband present, and 46.7% were non-families. 44.7% of all households were made up of individuals, and 30.9% had someone living alone who was 65 years of age or older. The average household size was 2.11 and the average family size was 2.98.

In the village, the population was spread out, with 19.9% under the age of 18, 5.5% from 18 to 24, 18.9% from 25 to 44, 19.9% from 45 to 64, and 35.8% who were 65 years of age or older. The median age was 49 years. For every 100 females, there were 85.8 males. For every 100 females age 18 and over, there were 77.6 males.

As of 2000 the median income for a household in the village was $20,417, and the median income for a family was $35,893. Males had a median income of $23,125 versus $18,036 for females. The per capita income for the village was $14,453. About 8.2% of families and 13.5% of the population were below the poverty line, including 18.8% of those under age 18 and 11.3% of those age 65 or over.

Education
It is in Boyd County Public Schools, established in June 2017. It was previously in West Boyd Schools, which was established in a merger in July 2007.

Notable people
 George Wagner, an American professional wrestler known as Gorgeous George, was born in Butte in 1915.
 Tim Walz, 41st Governor of Minnesota, and former U.S. Representative from Minnesota's First District, graduated from Butte High School in 1982.

References

External links
 Village of Butte
 History of Butte

Villages in Boyd County, Nebraska
Villages in Nebraska
County seats in Nebraska